The Bump Block-Bellevue House-Hawthorne Hotel is a historic seven-story building in Downtown Spokane, Washington. It was first built in 1890, and designed by architects Loren L. Rand and John K. Dow. It was expanded in 1909, and redesigned by architects Herman Preusse and Julius Zittel. It has been listed on the National Register of Historic Places since August 10, 2000.

References

National Register of Historic Places in Spokane County, Washington
Early Commercial architecture in the United States
Buildings and structures completed in 1890